The women's high jump event  at the 1994 European Athletics Indoor Championships was held in Palais Omnisports de Paris-Bercy on 11 and 12 March.

Medalists

Results

Qualification
Qualification performance: 1.89 (Q) or at least 12 best performers (q) advanced to the final.

Final

References

Final results

High jump at the European Athletics Indoor Championships
High
1994 in women's athletics